The British XIX Corps was a British infantry corps during World War I.

History 
British XIX Corps was formed in France in February 1917 and fought at the Battle of Passchendaele in Autumn 1917. In Spring 1918 it was driven back 20 miles in five days and found itself in disarray. By November 1918 the Corps, as an element of Second Army, was one of the most northerly British military formations in France.

Order of battle on 11 November 1918

Prior to the armistice, the corps was on the Second Army's left, with the 41st Division on the left, 35th in the centre and 31st on the right. It was composed of the following units, the 35th Division having been transferred from the II Corps on 3 November 1918:
41st Division (Major General Lawford)
31st Division (Major General Campbell)
35th Division (Major General Marinden)
Corps Troops
V/XIX Heavy Trench Mortar Battery
19 Cyclist Battalion
XIX Corps Signal Company

General Officers Commanding
Commanders included:
 February 1917 – November 1918 Lieutenant General Herbert Watts

References

British field corps
Corps of the British Army in World War I